Highwater Books was a small but influential independent comic book publisher based in Somerville, Massachusetts, noted for its arty editorial direction and production values under publisher Tom Devlin. Highwater began in 1997 and folded in November 2004 due to financial pressure.

Artists published 
 Marc Bell
 Mat Brinkman
 Greg Cook
 Megan Kelso
 James Kochalka
 Matt Madden
 John Porcellino
 Brian Ralph
 Ron Rege, Jr.

The press was also known for its ironically themed "Marvel Comics Benefit" anthology Coober Skeber, a prolific output of silkscreened posters and promotional materials, a loose association with Fort Thunder (where a number of Highwater artists resided) and Jordan Crane (publisher of NON), distribution of Jef Czekaj's Hypertruck (née R2D2 Is an Indie Rocker), and a few non-comic works of fiction, including a trio of books by Camden Joy.

List of publications 

*  Camden Joy's entries were prose
+  Dan Buck's entry was poetry
++ Co-published with Alternative Comics

Books distributed by Highwater Books
 Boys, Ron Regé, Jr.(a), Joan Reidy(w), 28 pages, 6" x 9", blue on pink
 Hypertruck VI, Jef Czekaj, 24 pages, 6-5/8" x 10-1/4", b/w
 Double Happiness, Jason Shiga, 72 pages, 6-5/8" x 9", b/w
 Stereoscomic, various, 256 pages, 6" x 9", b/w
 Col-Dee, Jordan Crane
 Epoxy, John Pham
 Fancy Froglin's Sexy Forest, James Kochalka
 Orchid, various
 Pamplemoussi, Genevieve Castree, w/ 12" vinyl record
 Peanut Butter and Jeremy's Best Book Ever!, James Kochalka
 The Imp #4, Dan Raeburn
 Where Hats Go, Kurt Wolfgang, 144 pages, 4" x 5.75", yeller and brown on cream
 Lost Valley: A trashy tale of excess, Megan Kelso(a), Daniel Snyder(w), 32 pages, b/w

Solicited books not published
 Maggots, Brian Chippendale,  320 pages, 5" x 6", two color
 I Pity You, Philippe Dupuy and Charles Berberian, 128 pages, 6" x 9", b/w
 Coober Skeber #3, various,  128 pages, 10" x 12", two color
 Crum Bums, Brian Ralph, 160 pages, 5" x 6", b/w
 SMB3, Ben Jones

Quotes 
Tom Spurgeon of The Comics Reporter:

Notes

Sources 
 Arnold, Andrew D. "The Complex Simplicity of John Porcellino," Time.com (Jul. 13, 2001).
 Dean, Michael. "Shrinking Alternatives: Is It Just Jeff Mason's Company or Is the Alternative Comic Book Format in Trouble?" The Comics Journal #263 (Oct. 14th, 2004)
 Koepke, Melora. "Bell's Ringing," Hour (Jan. 22nd, 2004).
 
 Spurgeon, Tom. "Highwater Books — An Appreciation," The Comics Reporter (Nov. 21, 2004).

Comic book publishing companies of the United States
Defunct comics and manga publishing companies